"How You Gonna See Me Now" is a song written by Alice Cooper, Bernie Taupin, and Dick Wagner, performed by Cooper and produced by David Foster. It was released on Cooper’s album, From the Inside.

The song reached number nine in Australia and the Netherlands.  In the U.S., it reached number 12 on the Billboard Hot 100.

The song was a regular part of Cooper’s setlist on the ‘Madhouse Rocks Tour’ supporting From the Inside, but despite its success as a single, “How You Gonna See Me Now” has never been performed live since 1980.

Chart performance

Weekly charts

Year-end charts

References

External links
 

Alice Cooper songs
1978 songs
1978 singles
Songs with lyrics by Bernie Taupin
Songs written by Alice Cooper
Songs written by Dick Wagner
Song recordings produced by David Foster
Music videos directed by Bruce Gowers
Warner Records singles
American soft rock songs
Rock ballads
1970s ballads